The director of the Joint Staff (DJS) is a three-star officer who assists the Joint Chiefs of Staff, a cabinet of senior military officers within the United States Armed Forces who advise the secretary of defense and the president on military matters. The director assists the chairman of the Joint Chiefs of Staff in managing the Joint Staff and with the management and organization of the staff's members. The director also chairs meetings of the Operations Deputies, a subsidiary body comprising the director and a three-star delegate from each service who preview or resolve issues before they are escalated to the four-star level of the Joint Chiefs of Staff.

The director of the Joint Staff is selected by the chairman of the Joint Chiefs of Staff, in consultation with the other members of the Joint Chiefs of Staff and subject to the approval of the secretary of defense. As with all three- and four-star positions, the director's appointment is subject to presidential nomination and Senate confirmation.

The position of director is considered one of the most desirable three-star positions in the United States military establishment, for the position has historically served as a stepping stone to a four-star position. As of June 2022, 37 of the 48 past directors and one past acting director, have been promoted to four-star rank. Many of them have been promoted to four-star rank within a year of leaving the position.

The current director of the Joint Staff is Lieutenant General James J. Mingus.

List of directors of the Joint Staff
This is a complete list of the directors of the Joint Staff.

See also
 List of active duty United States four-star officers
 List of United States Army four-star generals
 List of United States Marine Corps four-star generals
 List of United States Navy four-star admirals
 List of United States Air Force four-star generals

References

K